The tournament in Wuhan was a new edition to ITF Women's Circuit. 

Han Xinyun and Zhang Kailin won the inaugural event, defeating Miyu Kato and Makoto Ninomiya in the final, 6–4, 6–2.

Seeds

Draw

References 
 Draw

Wuhan - Doubles
Wuhan World Tennis Tour